3β-Androstenol, also known as 5α-androst-16-en-3β-ol, is a naturally occurring mammalian pheromone known to be present in humans and pigs. It is thought to play a role in axillary odor. It is produced from androstenone via the enzyme 3β-hydroxysteroid dehydrogenase. Unlike its C3α epimer 3α-androstenol, 3β-androstenol shows no potentiation of the GABAA receptor or anticonvulsant activity.

See also
 List of neurosteroids § Pheromones and pherines
 C19H30O

References

 
Androstanes
Human pheromones
Mammalian pheromones
Neurosteroids